KEEL (710 AM, "101.7 FM & 710 KEEL") is an American radio station broadcasting a News Talk Information format. Licensed to Shreveport, Louisiana, United States, the station serves the Shreveport area. The station is currently owned by Townsquare Media and features programming from Compass Media Networks, Premiere Networks, Radio America, and Westwood One, and airs Louisiana Tech games. Fox News updates are carried at the top of every hour. Its studios are shared with its other five sister stations in West Shreveport (one mile west of Shreveport Regional Airport), and the transmitter is in Dixie.

Marie Gifford Wright
A native of Cordell in Washita County in western Oklahoma, Marie Gifford (1917–2004), later Marie Wright, launched a career in radio in the 1940s in Oklahoma City. In 1945, she relocated to Shreveport and became the first woman manager of a local radio station. In 1962, she was named general manager of KEEL and KMBQ (formerly KEEL-FM, now KXKS-FM). From 1965 to 1975, she was vice president of LIN Broadcasting; when the company became the expanded and reorganized Multi-Media Broadcasting, with newspaper and television holdings as well as radio, Gifford continued in the vice presidency from 1975 to 1980.

In 1970, Gifford became the first woman to run for mayor of Shreveport on a platform of downtown revitalization and civil rights. She was defeated in the Democratic primary by municipal utilities commissioner Calhoun Allen, who then prevailed in the general election over the Republican mayoral choice, Edward Leo "Ed" McGuire Jr. (1914–1983), a Massachusetts native and a member of the Caddo Parish School Board.

In 1988, Wright was named recipient of the "Women Who Have Made a Difference" award. Former State Senator Virginia Shehee, who served with Wright on the boards of the Shreveport Symphony and the Strand Theatre, said that Wright's fight for equality had a major impact in Shreveport.

In 1979, Gifford married Harold Arthur Wright (1907–2012), an entrepreneur originally from Moultrie County in central Illinois, who owned the former Whatleys, Wills, and Wright appliance centers in Shreveport, Monroe, and Jackson, Mississippi.

History
The station originated with the call letters WDAN, licensed on May 19, 1922, to W.G. Patterson and Glenwood Radio Corporation, a Shreveport radio equipment dealer. The first broadcasts were made from Centenary College in Shreveport using a 10-watt transmitter. By July of the same year Patterson and his associates moved the station to a new location, increased power to 50 watts, and was assigned call letters WGAQ. Local businessman W.K. Henderson became involved with the station, eventually gaining a controlling interest. In January 1925, Henderson relocated the transmitter site to his estate at Kennonwood, north of Shreveport. The station's call letters at that time were changed to KWKH (not to be confused with the present-day KWKH, a separate station later started by Henderson in 1926 after he had sold interest in the former WGAQ). On August 14, 1926, W. G. Patterson and associates organized the Shreveport Broadcasting Association, purchasing the interest of W.K. Henderson in the station, and changing the call letters to KSBA. The station changed ownership again in 1929, and the call letters were changed to KTBS.

As KTBS, the station joined NBC's Southwest group February 28, 1932, becoming the 88th station affiliated with NBC. At that time, KTBS was owned by Tristate Broadcasting System Inc. and broadcast on 1450 kHz with 1 KW power. KTBS launched a television station, KTBS-TV (channel 3) in 1955, which remains under local ownership.

KTBS sold its radio operations to the McLendon Group in 1957. The call letters were changed to the current KEEL, and the NBC affiliation was dropped. The sale brought a complete makeover of the station into a Top 40 format, in line with other McLendon stations such as KLIF in Dallas. KEEL enjoyed much improved ratings during this time.

References

External links 

 
 

Radio stations in Louisiana
News and talk radio stations in the United States
Townsquare Media radio stations
1922 establishments in Louisiana
Radio stations established in 1922
Radio stations licensed before 1923 and still broadcasting